Into the Light may refer to:

Albums
Into the Light (Chris de Burgh album), 1986
Into the Light (David Coverdale album), 2000
Into the Light (Gloria Estefan album), 1991
Into the Light (Fady Maalouf album), 2010
Into the Light (Phil Stacey album), 2009
Nuclear Blast All-Stars: Into the Light, a compilation album from Nuclear Blast Records
Into the Light (Matthew West album), 2012
Into the Light, classical album by The Sixteen
Into the Light (Linda Andrews album), 2009
Into the Light (Marisa Anderson album), 2016

Songs
"Into the Light", a song by Siouxsie and the Banshees from the album Juju
"Into the Light" (Fady Maalouf song), 2010
"Into the Light", a song by Rage from the album Strings to a Web
"Into the Light", a song by Gareth Emery
"Into the Light", a song by Joe Satriani from the album Flying in a Blue Dream

Other uses
Into the Light (musical), musical from 1986
"Into the Light" (The Twilight Zone), an episode of The Twilight Zone
Into the Light, a radio  soap opera
Into The Light Indonesia, an Indonesian suicide prevention non-profit organization